Euphaedra solida is a butterfly in the family Nymphalidae. It is found in the Democratic Republic of the Congo.

References

Butterflies described in 1997
solida
Endemic fauna of the Democratic Republic of the Congo
Butterflies of Africa